The 4th FINA World Swimming Championships (25 m) was an international swimming meet organized by FINA, held 1–4 April 1999 at the Hong Kong Coliseum in Hong Kong. It features 516 swimmers from 61 nations, swimming in 40 short course (25 m pool) events.

Participating nations
59 of 61 nations with swimmers at the 1999 Short Course Worlds were:

Results

Men's events

Women's events

Medal standings

References

FINA World Swimming Championships (25 m)
FINA Short Course
S
Fina World Swimming Championships (25 M), 1999
S
April 1999 sports events in Asia